The forest penduline tit (Anthoscopus flavifrons) is a species of bird in the family Remizidae.
It is found in Cameroon, Central African Republic, Republic of the Congo, Democratic Republic of the Congo, Ivory Coast, Gabon, Ghana, Liberia, and Nigeria.
Its natural habitat is subtropical or tropical moist lowland forest.

References

forest penduline tit
Birds of Central Africa
Birds of West Africa
forest penduline tit
Taxonomy articles created by Polbot